Nord-Ostsee-Bahn or NOB is a railway company which operates in Schleswig-Holstein, Germany. Based in Kiel, the company was established in 2000 and is owned by Transdev. The company's main route is the Marsh Railway between Hamburg and Westerland.

Fleet
NOB operated two classes of diesel-electric locomotives, both on the section between Hamburg and Sylt: the Di 6 (DE 2700) and the Eurorunner (DE 2000). It uses two classes of diesel multiple units: the Alstom Coradia LINT and the Bombardier Talent.

References

Railway companies of Germany
Private railway companies of Germany
Veolia
Companies based in Kiel